Jürgen Wirth (born 20 June 1965) is a German former biathlete. He competed in the 20 km individual event at the 1988 Winter Olympics, representing East Germany.

References

External links
 

1965 births
Living people
German male biathletes
Olympic biathletes of East Germany
Biathletes at the 1988 Winter Olympics
People from Ilm-Kreis
Sportspeople from Thuringia